The East Rochester Union Free School District is a public school district in New York State that serves approximately 1,200 students in the Town/Village of East Rochester and portions of the towns of Penfield, Perinton and Pittsford in Monroe County, with over 200 employees and an operating budget of $23 million (~$16,838 per student).

The average class size is 20-23 students and the student-teacher ratio is 11:1.

The District's motto is "Tradition and Vision".

James Haugh is Superintendent.

Board of education
The Board of Education (BOE) consists of 5 members who serve rotating 3-year terms. Elections are held each May for board members and to vote on the School District Budget.

Current board members are:
Colette Morabito, President
Jennifer Majewski Lesinski, Vice-President
Tim Henry
Margy Richards
Vincent Antonicelli

Schools

Elementary schools
East Rochester Elementary School (PK-5), Principal - Marisa Philp

Middle school-high school
East Rochester Junior/Senior High School (6-12), Principal - Casey van Harssel

Notes

References

External links

New York State School Boards Association
East Rochester history

School districts in New York (state)
Education in Monroe County, New York
School districts established in 1920